The Great Chesapeake Bay Schooner Race (GCBSR) is an annual schooner race established in 1990 that takes place on the Chesapeake Bay. The race—held in October of each year—begins just south of the Chesapeake Bay Bridge near Annapolis, Maryland, and ends at Thimble Shoal Light north of the Hampton Roads channel, covering . Pre- and post-race activities take place in Baltimore, Maryland, and Portsmouth, Virginia, respectively. Proceeds from the race support Chesapeake Bay education and preservation projects. The current time to beat is 11 hours, 1 minutes, 41 seconds and was set in 2017 by the schooner Virginia. The previous time to beat was 11 hours, 18 minutes, 53 seconds and was set in 2007 by the schooner Virginia.

History
The race started as a challenge from Lane Briggs, the captain of the steel-hulled, sail-powered tugboat Norfolk Rebel, to Jan Miles, the captain of Pride of Baltimore II. The first official race was held in 1990.

Results

References

External links

Chesapeake Bay
Recurring sporting events established in 1990
Sailing competitions in the United States
+
+